Vancouveria planipetala is a species of flowering plant in the barberry family known by the common names redwood inside-out flower and redwood ivy.

Distribution
The plant  is native to northwestern California and southwestern Oregon, where it occurs in Klamath Mountains and northern California Coast Ranges.

It grows in forests, especially Coast redwood forests.

Description
Vancouveria planipetala is a rhizomatous perennial herb with a short, mostly underground stem. It produces a patch of basal leaves which are each made up of round or heart-shaped leaflets borne on long, reddish petioles.

The inflorescence appears in May and June. It is a panicle of flowers on a long, erect peduncle. Each small, drooping flower has six inner sepals which look like petals. They are a few millimeters in length, white, and reflexed back, or upwards, away from the flower center. Lying against the sepals are the smaller true petals, which are white or purple-tinged and flat-tipped or notched. There are six stamens and a large glandular ovary.

The species is cultivated as an ornamental plant, for planting in native plant and wildlife gardens.

References

External links
Jepson Manual eFlora (TJM2) treatment of Vancouveria planipetala
U.C. CalPhotos gallery of Vancouveria planipetala

planipetala
Flora of California
Flora of Oregon
Flora of the Klamath Mountains
Natural history of the California Coast Ranges
Garden plants of North America
Flora without expected TNC conservation status